Chester A. Krohn (April 16, 1915 – October 18, 1996) was an American teacher and politician.

Born in Marshfield, Wisconsin, Krohn graduated from University of Wisconsin–Madison and was a high school teacher. He served as clerk of the Marshfield Board of Education. In 1941, Krohn served in the Wisconsin State Assembly and was elected on the Wisconsin Progressive Party ticket.

Notes

1915 births
1996 deaths
People from Marshfield, Wisconsin
University of Wisconsin–Madison alumni
Educators from Wisconsin
Wisconsin Progressives (1924)
School board members in Wisconsin
Members of the Wisconsin State Assembly
20th-century American politicians
20th-century American educators